Movses Abelian is an Armenian-Georgian diplomat and United Nations official. In June 2019, the United Nations Secretary-General António Guterres appointed him as Under-Secretary-General for General Assembly and Conference Management. He additionally appointed him, on 3 September 2019, as UN Coordinator for Multilingualism.

Education and career 
Abelian was educated at schools in Armenia, the Russian Federation, and the United States. He served as an associate professor at Yerevan State University, starting in 1989. In 1992, he joined the Armenian Foreign Service. He was Deputy Permanent Representative of Armenia to the United Nations from 1996 to 1998, before becoming Ambassador and Permanent Representative in 1998, a position in which he served until 2003. He was President of the UNICEF Executive Board in 2001.

In 2011, he was appointed Director of the Security Council Affairs Division and Secretary of the United Nations Security Council. In 2016, he was appointed Assistant Secretary-General of the United Nations, responsible for General Assembly affairs and conference management (2016–2019).

In 2019, he was made Under-Secretary-General for General Assembly and Conference Management, and later that year was made UN Coordinator for Multilingualism.

Personal life 
He and his wife have two children.

References

Year of birth missing (living people)
Living people
Permanent Representatives of Armenia to the United Nations
Chairmen and Presidents of UNICEF
Armenian officials of the United Nations